Naimee Coleman (born 8 December 1976) is an Irish singer/songwriter from Dundrum, Dublin, Ireland.  Coleman began writing music at the age of 14 and won the 2FM Song Contest in 1994 as a member of a band named the Wilde Oscars. After signing with EMI, she recorded her first solo album, Silver Wrists. The album was produced by Peter Van Hooke and recorded in Abbey Road Studios. The follow-up, Bring Down the Moon, came 4 years later.

On the strength of these records, she toured throughout Europe, the US and as far afield as Japan, where her singles topped airplay charts. While touring, Naimee has shared the stage with and opened up for artists such as Van Morrison, Susanne Vega, Jackson Browne, 10,000 Maniacs, Sinéad O'Connor and Sting. She has written with Howard Jones, Phill Thornally (The Cure), Pam Rose, Maiah Sharpe and Aurora. In 2000, Naimee appeared on Aurora's UK top 5 cover of Duran Duran's "Ordinary World" as a guest vocalist.

She provided the vocals for Cass & Slide's "Perception" (Vocal Mix) in 2000 and has also done vocals for Aurora, most notably on the songs "Ordinary World" (2000) and "Sleeping Satellite" (2003). She sings backup vocals for two tracks on the 2003 Saucy Monky album "Celebrity Trash" and joined Saucy Monky's 2017 Irish reunion tour.

Discography
 Silver Wrists (Chrysalis, 1996)
 Bring Down the Moon (Chrysalis, 2001)

References

Living people
Musicians from Dublin (city)
1976 births